Millstadt Township is located in St. Clair County, Illinois. As of the 2010 census, its population was 6,718 and it contained 2,782 housing units.

Geography

Demographics

References

External links
Millstadt Township Government Official Site
City-data.com
St. Clair County Official Site
Illinois State Archives

Townships in St. Clair County, Illinois
Townships in Illinois